Cardinal Carter Academy for the Arts (CCAA, Cardinal Carter, or Carter) is a Catholic arts high school located in Toronto, Ontario, Canada. Admission to the school is granted through an audition process. Serving students from grade 7 to 12, it is one of three schools in the Toronto Catholic District School Board that is an elementary and secondary hybrid (the others being Francis Libermann Catholic High School and St. Michael's Choir School). The school has been consistently ranked as one of the top educational institutions in Ontario.

History 
The school was named after Cardinal Gerald Emmett Carter, Ordinary of the Archdiocese of Toronto since 1979, a strong supporter of education and a distinguished patron of the arts. Cardinal Carter school community is built upon Gospel values and the love of learning.

Following the provincial government funding extension to Roman Catholic high schools in June 1984, the Metropolitan Separate School Board (now the Toronto Catholic District School Board) considered establishing a school for the visual and performing arts.

Cardinal Carter was built at the former St. Edward Catholic School which moved to the North York Board of Education's closed Burnett Public School on Eddiefield Avenue in 1985. That same year, it was the satellite campus of the newly established Mary Ward Catholic Secondary School. In 1986, the MSSB reached a deal with Tridel, a Canadian condominium developer, to acquire  of St. Edward property owned by the Board. In return, Tridel built a $10 million three-storey school on the board's  property. The first set of auditions were held in January 1990. The school facilities were designed by Makrimichalos Cugini Architects and features a proscenium stage, full orchestra pit, dance, drama, music and art studios, practice and rehearsal rooms.

Before the opening of Cardinal Carter, the building was then temporarily used by St. Bruno Catholic School, located in Downtown Toronto, which was closed due to health problems. Because of budget problems, the MSSB originally delayed the school's opening to September 1991 citing a tax increase to 9.5% and pulled Carter from the budget during its 26 April meeting. However, on 17 May 1990, the MSSB trustees reversed the decision proceeding the opening of Carter as planned.

On 4 September 1990, Cardinal Carter opened its doors to 269 pupils in the seventh, eighth, and ninth grades with Millie Seguin as its founding principal. The school was blessed in 1991 and the first graduates emerged in 1994. One of the school's original students was the daughter of CBC Television's hit show Seeing Things, Louis Del Grande.

Since 1999, the school operates a second campus using the TCDSB's Catholic Education Centre building just across the street.

Admissions 
The primary intake years are grades 7 and 9. Admission at senior levels is possible if space is available, and only at  times of the school year when it is educationally sound to transition students.

Audition requirements differ with every arts area. Drama majors must complete a workshop and perform a memorized monologue. Dance students must participate in a 90-minute dance class and perform a one-minute improvisation. All music students will be given an ear training/rhythm test; furthermore, instrumentalists need to sight read a piece of music and perform a solo piece, while vocalists need to sing 'O Canada' without accompaniment. Visual artists must first submit a portfolio of assigned exercises (Round 1); further audition requirements are then sent out (Round 2).

Arts 
Students receive a balanced and thorough education in the arts, and through the arts. The integrated and accelerated arts program allows students to concentrate in one of four majors: music (vocal, band, string instruments), drama, dance, or visual arts.  There is a theoretical and practical aspect within each art major.

Dance 
Dance students learn both classical ballet and contemporary dance. They also learn about dance theory and composition to choreograph original performances.

Dancers perform in outreach performances, school liturgies and Dance Night, a year-end performance. Every two years, the Dance Department puts on a Christmas production of The Nutcracker.

The Dance facilities include two 40 feet wide, 30 feet deep studios with floor to ceiling mirrors, permanent ballet barres, and non-slip sprung hardwood floors.

Drama 
Students explore the following areas: voice, movement, theatre games, mask, mime, musical theatre, improvisation, stage combat, theatre history, outreach performances, short film production and directing. There is a variety of exciting performance opportunities available to students over the course of the school year. Students can also participate in the Canadian Improv Games, the National Theatre School Festival and various short film competitions.

In order to broaden their experience, students regularly work with a variety of guest artists from the professional community in such areas as scene study, script writing, musical theatre, sword work and mask.

Instrumental music 
The Instrumental Music Department includes Strings and Band. Music students perform many times during the year and host a Christmas and spring concert. Music students frequently participate in festivals and competitions, such as Kiwanis Music Festival and TCDSB Music Festival. The Music Department performs internationally on biennial music trips.

Strings 
The Strings Department is organized into four orchestras. The Junior Strings Orchestra consists primarily of the students in Grades 7, 8 and 9. Intermediate Strings include students in Grades 9 and 10. Senior Strings primarily include the students in Grades 11 and 12, with deserving younger musicians integrated into the ensemble. The Senior Chamber Strings are a chamber string orchestra who perform select standard repertoire for String Orchestra.

The Cardinal Carter String Orchestras have earned over 100 first-place finishes in the Kiwanis Music Festival.

CCAA Chamber Strings was the only Canadian string orchestra to perform at the Midwest Clinic in Chicago in 2008. CCAA Chamber Strings performed at Carnegie Hall in New York City in 2011.

Band 
The Band Department is organized into the following ensembles: Junior Concert Band, which plays repertoire at the 200-300 level, Intermediate Concert Band, which plays repertoire at the 300-400 level, and Wind Symphony, which plays repertoire at the 400-500 level.

The Band Department regularly participates in the Ontario Band Association Concert Band Festival. The Wind Symphony performed at the Festival at Carnegie Hall in 2014.

Vocal 
In all vocal music courses, students study theory, history, listening, dictation, ear training, sight singing/solfège and prepare for performance of choral repertoire, vocalises, and solos. Senior students plan and perform their own solo recitals.

Vocalists make up the choir for school Mass.

Students participate in the school's annual Christmas and spring music concerts as well as the annual Festival of Nine Lessons and Carols, held at various churches in the Greater Toronto Area. The Vocal Program has achieved a number of first-place finishes (platinum awards) at the Kiwanis festivals. Students have performed the Duruflé Requiem with the Brampton Symphony Orchestra, sacred concerts with Elmer Iseler Singers, and several performances of the Missa Gaia.

Visual arts 
The Visual Arts curriculum covers drawing, painting, sculpture, installation art, photography, printmaking, media studies, performance art, design and information design. Art appreciation, theory and history are inclusive for each grade. Specializations and portfolio preparation for college, university and art based alternatives are provided for all senior students. The Visual Arts program further provides opportunities for students to take part in a variety of outreach community projects, interact with professional artists, experience current gallery trends and take part in interdisciplinary projects.

Academics 
Students must take a full academic course load in addition to their arts major. Cardinal Carter has a Gifted/Enriched program to further accommodate students with individualized needs.

The school has been continually ranked as one of the best performing high schools in Ontario based on academics by the Fraser Institute.

Cardinal Carter has earned a spot among the top 40 schools in the country as chosen by Maclean's and Today's Parent Magazine. CCAA was selected as a runner up in the "Classrooms of Creativity" category.

Uniform 
Required tops include a navy blue or white crested golf shirt or a white or light blue dress shirt. Optional tops include a crested cardigan vest, zippered jacket, crewneck pullover or zip polo, all of which must be worn over the golf shirt or dress shirt.

Notable students

Dance 
Leah Miller, television host
Anjelika Reznik, Olympic gymnast

Drama 
Raymond Ablack, Degrassi: The Next Generation, Ginny and Georgia
Giacomo Gianniotti, Grey's Anatomy
Eliana Jones, Hemlock Grove
Jamie Johnston, Degrassi: The Next Generation
Stephanie Paterson, Big Brother Canada Season 10 Contestant
Caterina Scorsone, Grey's Anatomy and Private Practice
Katherine Winter, Billions, Lady In The Lake, The Verdon Fosse® Legacy

Music 
Toya Alexis, singer
Martina Ortiz-Luis, singer, actress in Wynonna Earp Season 4
Natalie Di Luccio, vocalist
Amanda Joy, Second Jen
Martha Joy, singer
Alessandra Paonessa, vocalist
Tony Yike Yang, youngest prizewinner of the International Chopin Piano Competition
FrancisGotHeat, multi-platinum music producer
Chelsea Clark, actor

Visual Arts

See also 
List of high schools in Ontario
Cardinal Carter Catholic High School

Other art schools 
Bishop Marrocco/Thomas Merton Catholic Secondary School and Regional Arts Centre
Earl Haig Secondary School
Etobicoke School of the Arts
Father John Redmond Catholic Secondary School and Regional Arts Centre
Rosedale Heights School of the Arts
St. Elizabeth Catholic High School (Regional Arts Program)
St. Michael's Choir School
St. Mother Teresa Catholic Academy
St. Patrick Catholic Secondary School
Wexford Collegiate School for the Arts

Footnotes

External links 
Cardinal Carter Academy for the Arts
TCDSB Portal

Art schools in Canada
Educational institutions established in 1990
High schools in Toronto
Music schools in Canada
Catholic elementary schools in Ontario
Catholic secondary schools in Ontario
Toronto Catholic District School Board
1990 establishments in Ontario